The Zeb Ferguson House is a historic house on the north side of United States Route 65 in Marshall, Arkansas.  It is a single-story structure, built out of rough-cut sandstone, with simulated quoining at the corners and openings in brick.  It has a hip roof with two cross-gables, and exposed rafter ends under the eaves.  The south-facing front has a hip-roof porch supported by three square columns set on brick piers.  The house was built about 1928 by Doc Treat and Zeb Ferguson for the latter.  Ferguson was a prominent local businessman.  The house they built is one of the finest examples in Marshall of Ozark stone architecture.

The house was listed on the National Register of Historic Places in 1993.

See also
Ferguson Gas Station, also built and owned by Zeb Ferguson
National Register of Historic Places listings in Searcy County, Arkansas

References

Houses on the National Register of Historic Places in Arkansas
Houses in Searcy County, Arkansas
National Register of Historic Places in Searcy County, Arkansas